Thomas Arimi (born 17 October 1933) is a Ghanaian boxer. He competed in the men's light heavyweight event at the 1964 Summer Olympics.

References

External links
 

1933 births
Living people
Ghanaian male boxers
Olympic boxers of Ghana
Boxers at the 1964 Summer Olympics
Place of birth missing (living people)
Commonwealth Games medallists in boxing
Boxers at the 1962 British Empire and Commonwealth Games
Commonwealth Games silver medallists for Ghana
Light-heavyweight boxers
Medallists at the 1962 British Empire and Commonwealth Games